Vizol Vitso-n Koso (16 November 1914 – 3 March 2008) was an Indian politician from Nagaland who served as the 4th Chief Minister of Nagaland twice from February 1974 until March 1975 and November 1977 until April 1980. He became the Chief Minister of Nagaland as part of the United Democratic Front (Nagaland).

Early life
Vizol Koso was born on 16 November 1914 to a Southern Angami family from Viswema. He did his initial education from Mission High School, Kohima. He did his matriculation from Government High School, Shillong. In 1951, he  graduated from St. Edmund's College, Shillong.

During the Second World War, Vizol joined the Royal Indian Air Force and served until 1946. After the war, he served as a private teacher in John High School, Viswema.

From 1953 to 1956, he served as the Principal of the Naga National High School, Kohima. He was imprisoned twice—1956 and 1957 on political grounds. He also served as the Vice President of the Naga People's Convention from 1957 to 1960. He was also one of the founding members of the Kohima Science College, Jotsoma in 1961.

Vizol was elected a member of the first Nagaland Assembly in February 1964 from the Southern Angami-II (Vidhan Sabha constituency) constituency as a Naga National Democratic Party candidate (later became the Nagaland People's Council) and later became the leader of the Opposition till it resigned en bloc after a ceasefire agreement was signed in September 1964. He did not contest the second state elections in 1969.

Peace initiatives
In 1966, Vizol was part of the five member-Nagaland Peace Commission formed in Kohima as an initiative of the Nagaland Baptist Church Council. It passed a resolution asking government authorities and public to strengthen peace work in Nagaland. Along with Vizol, Nabakrushna Choudhuri, Lakshmi N. Menon, Mayangnokcha Ao, and Nivukha were part of the commission. They met the Naga underground leaders at Chedema.

First term as Chief Minister (1974–1975)
He was re-elected in 1974 from the Southern Angami II constituency, and was unanimously chosen as the leader of United Democratic Front party and was appointed the Chief Minister of Nagaland. The government later collapsed due to defections. Following political instability, President’s rule was imposed in the state on March 22, 1975.

Second term as Chief Minister (1977–1980)
Vizol was again re-elected uncontested to the Nagaland Assembly in 1977 and became the Chief Minister for the second time but it again collapsed in 1980.

Post Chief Ministership
In the subsequent two general elections in 1982 and 1987, Vizol failed to get elected.

In the 1989 elections, he kept out of the fray but led the newly formed Nagaland People’s Council, the new name of Naga National Democratic Party, currently as Naga People's Front (NPF), as the party Chairman. He contested the 1989 Lok Sabha election, but lost to Congress candidate Shikiho Sema. He was a member of the Rajya Sabha from 1992 to 1997 and also a member of the Parliamentary Committee on Communication, Energy, Gas, Afforestation and Eco-development.

He was the founding member of the Nagaland State Branch of the Indian Red Cross Society in 1982, and served as its Chairman till he resigned in 2004, on health grounds. He was known to lead a life of simplicity, honesty and peace loving, which he showed in his way of living to be emulated by others.

Death
Vizol died on 3 March 2008 at 07:10 Indian Standard Time (UTC+05:30), at his personal residence in Daklane Ward, Kohima after a prolonged illness and his remains were laid to rest at Viswema.

Personal life

Family
Vizol married Razoulhou–ü in 1948. Together the couple had two daughters and four sons.

References

External links 

Naga people
Chief Ministers of Nagaland
1914 births
2008 deaths
Nagaland MLAs 1974–1975
Nagaland MLAs 1977–1982
Rajya Sabha members from Nagaland
Indian military personnel of World War II
People from Viswema
People from Kohima